SM UB-110 was a German Type UB III submarine or U-boat in the German Imperial Navy during World War I.

Construction

UB-110 was built by Blohm & Voss of Hamburg. After just under a year of construction, it was launched at Hamburg on 1 September 1917 and commissioned in the spring of 1918 under the command of Kptlt. Werner Fürbringer. It had a displacement of  while surfaced and  when submerged. Its engines enabled it to travel at  when surfaced and  when submerged.

Ships hit by UB-110
During its lifetime, UB-110 is confirmed to have torpedoed two ships, the Sprucol and the Southborough. The Sprucol was a 1,137 GRT tanker being operated by the Royal Fleet Auxiliary at the time of engagement, when it was damaged off the English coast but made it back to the Humber with no casualties. The 3,709-ton civilian steamer Southborough was not to be so lucky, sunk 5 miles off the east coast of Scarborough on 16 July 1918 with the loss of 30 civilian lives.

Sinking
The submarine was commissioned into the German Imperial Navy on 23 March 1918 as SM UB-110.

This was possibly the last U-boat sinking during the Great War.

In his postwar memoirs, Fürbringer alleged that, after the sinking, HMS Garry hove to and opened fire with revolvers and machine guns on the unarmed crew in the water. He states that he saw the skull of his 18-year old steward split open by a lump of coal hurled by a member of Garry's crew. He also states that when he attempted to help a wounded officer to swim, the man said, "Let me die in peace. The swine are going to murder us anyhow." The memoir states that the shooting ceased only when the convoy that the destroyer had been escorting, and that contained many neutral-flagged ships, arrived on the scene, at which point "as if by magic the British now let down some life boats into the water." 

While Lightoller does not go into detail about the sinking in his memoir, does confirm Fürbringer's memoirs by admitting that he "refused to accept the hands up air" business. Lightoller explained, "In fact it was simply amazing that they should have had the infernal audacity to offer to surrender, in view of their ferocious and pitiless attacks on our merchant ships. Destroyer versus Destroyer, as in the Dover Patrol, was fair game and no favour. One could meet them and take them on as a decent antagonist. But towards the submarine men, one felt an utter disgust and loathing; they were nothing but an abomination, polluting the clean sea." 

Lieutenant Commander Lightoller was awarded a bar to his Distinguished Service Cross for sinking UB-110. A total of 23 members of UB-110'''s crew died in the action and at the hands of Garry's crew after the sinking.

Rescue operation

HMTBD Bonetta arrived late on the scene and picked up five survivors, including the captain, but one of them, the engineer officer, died on deck immediately after being taken out of the water. The German captain, despite the ordeal he had come through, proved himself to be a very self-possessed individual when examined in the chart room. He expressed the opinion that Germany would shortly win the war, but he was a long way out in his calculation, as Germany was defeated six weeks later. The Bonetta's duties around that time had included picking up many, badly wounded, survivors, and dead, from fishing boats, which had been shelled by a German submarine, off the entrance to the Tyne. Perhaps unsurprisingly, the crew of the Bonetta were not made aware of any massacre.

Boat raisedUB-110'' was raised on 4 October 1918 and broken up at Swan Hunter shipyard on the Tyne. An album of photographs of the vessel has been shared by Tyne and Wear Archives "The sinking and raising of UB-110"

An unsettling discovery during its salvage was that some of its torpedoes were fitted with magnetic firing pistols—the first to be properly identified by the British. These early examples were problematic, often detonating their weapons prematurely if at all.

Summary of raiding history

References

Notes

Citations

Bibliography 

 

British war crimes
German Type UB III submarines
World War I submarines of Germany
U-boats commissioned in 1918
1917 ships
Massacres committed by the United Kingdom
Ships built in Hamburg
Maritime incidents in 1918
U-boats sunk in 1918
U-boats sunk by depth charges
U-boats sunk by British warships
World War I crimes by the British Empire and Commonwealth
World War I massacres
World War I shipwrecks in the English Channel
Massacres in 1918